Don Juan, or If Don Juan Were a Woman is a 1973 erotic drama film directed by Roger Vadim. It sees Vadim reunite with his leading lady and ex-wife Brigitte Bardot for their fifth film together. Bardot achieved international stardom and Vadim got his break when he directed her in the 1956 film And God Created Woman.

Premise
Jeanne believes she is the reincarnation of Don Juan and prides herself in the destruction of men who have fallen for her charms. She confesses murder to her cousin, a priest named Paul, to whom she also frankly details her past sexual encounters.

Cast
 Brigitte Bardot as Jeanne
 Robert Hossein as Louis Prévost
 Mathieu Carrière as Paul
 Michèle Sand as Léporella
 Robert Walker Jr. as the guitarist
 Jane Birkin as Clara
 Maurice Ronet as Pierre Gonzague

Production
Vadim said in an interview after the film came out:
My attitude to women is accepted today in a way that it wasn't when I started out as director. But today women overreact – they pretend to be free on an intellectual and sexual level but because of our Christian traditions sex is always associated with guilt. Now however it's possible for a woman to have the same relationship with sex as a man – a man who is a lover can be a Don Juan whereas women like that were always considered whores or femmes faciles (easy women). But I think a woman can be free without being a whore. A female Don Juan can exist nowadays without a sense of guilt.
He later elaborated:
Don Juan is the end of a period – problems about love and sex, cruelty and romanticism on an aesthetic level – and I wanted to finish that period with Brigitte because I started with her as a director (And God Created Woman). Underneath what people call "the Bardot myth" was something interesting, even though she was never considered the most professional actress in the world. For years, since she has been growing older, and the Bardot myth has become just a souvenir, I wanted to work with Brigitte. I was curious in her as a woman and I had to get to the end of something with her, to get out of her and express many things I felt were in her. Brigitte always gave the impression of sexual freedom – she is a completely open and free person, without any aggression. So I gave her the part of a man – that amused me.
Vadim said he was attracted to the character of Don Juan was "the sense of defiance on every level. Its someone who refuses to be involved in any system. In the film it's a woman who defies men – and I do the film like the character – against all the rules."
Vadim says he deliberately pulled back on the sex scenes. "I was interested in the idea of seduction, not what happened in bed – though I would love to make a documentary on how they fucked."

Jane Birkin plays the role of a woman who falls in love with Brigitte Bardot's character. "I accepted immediately just to be in bed with Bardot", said Birkin later. "She's the most utterly perfect woman. There's not a fault. God knows, I looked. Even her feet are pretty."

"If there's homosexuality between men, they have to be queer", said Vadim. "But women can have relationships with other women without being dykes. Brigitte seduced this girl to hit the man, and the girl is enchanted not to be treated as a sex object for once in her life."

"If Don Juan is not my last movie, it will be my next to last", said Bardot during filming.

Reception
The film received poor reviews in France.

The Guardian wrote that the film "like so many of his [Vadim's] films, has some beautiful photography and slick editing but few plausible scenes. Incapable of creating an illusion, Vadim is eminently capable of creating an illusion of creativity." "It stinks" said another review for the same paper.

"I have seen as much passion, and almost as much flesh, at the Test match", wrote The Observer.

David Thomson, in his Biographical History of Film, felt that there was "awful sadness" in Bardot's appearance.

References

External links
 
 
 Review at Sunset Gun
 Review at DVD Journal
 Review at The A.V. Club

1973 films
1973 drama films
1973 LGBT-related films
1970s English-language films
1970s French-language films
1970s Swedish-language films
1970s erotic drama films
1973 multilingual films
English-language French films
English-language Italian films
Films directed by Roger Vadim
Films based on the Don Juan legend
Films set in London
Films set in Paris
Films set in Sweden
French erotic drama films
French LGBT-related films
French multilingual films
Italian erotic drama films
Italian LGBT-related films
Italian multilingual films
Lesbian-related films
LGBT-related drama films
1970s Italian films
1970s French films
French-language Italian films